An entertainer is a person who entertains (singer, actor, comedian, etc.)

The Entertainer may refer to:

Music

Songs
"The Entertainer" (rag), a 1902 classic piano rag written by Scott Joplin
"The Entertainer", rearrangement of the Joplin rag by Marvin Hamlisch for the 1973 film The Sting
"The Entertainer" (song), a 1974 song by Billy Joel
"The Entertainer" (The Belle Stars song), 1983
"Entertainer" (Zayn song), 2018

Albums
The Entertainer (Jaki Byard album), 1972
The Entertainer, by Marvin Hamlisch, 1974
The Entertainer (D'banj album), 2008
The Entertainer (Alesha Dixon album), 2010

Media
The Entertainer (play), a 1957 play by John Osborne
The Entertainer (film), a 1960 film adaptation of the play
The Entertainer (Garth Brooks video album), a 2006 DVD collection of television specials and music videos
Entertainer (TV series), a 2016 South Korean series
"The Entertainer", a 2002 episode of the TV show Black Books
The Entertainer, a 2005 reality television show hosted by Wayne Newton
The Entertainers, a 1964 TV show
The Entertainers (radio program), a Canadian radio show 1978–1992

Companies
The Entertainer (discount publisher), a publisher of coupon books
The Entertainer (retailer), a group of toy shops in the UK, established in 1981
The Entertainer! Magazine, published by Times Media Group (Arizona)

Other 
"The Entertainer", a 2007 contestant on the VH1 reality show I Love New York 2 and other reality shows
a nickname of John Parrott, snooker player
 The Entertainers, a nickname given to Newcastle United during the 90's
The Illinois Entertainer, a Chicago-based music magazine published monthly since 1974
Cedric the Entertainer (born 1964), American actor and comedian